Hamidou Keyta (born 17 December 1994) is a French  professional footballer who plays as a forward for Azeri club Zira.

Club career
Keyta made his professional debut for Saint-Étienne in a 1–1 Ligue 1 tie with Lille on 13 January 2017.

On 31 July 2021, he joined Portuguese club Santa Clara on a two-year contract.

On 26 January 2022, Keyta signed an 18-month contract with Zira.

Personal life
Keyta is of Senegalese descent.

References

External links
 
 
 
 

1994 births
People from Montivilliers
Sportspeople from Seine-Maritime
French sportspeople of Senegalese descent
Living people
French footballers
Association football forwards
AJ Auxerre players
Le Havre AC players
Trélissac FC players
AS Saint-Étienne players
Championnat National players
FC Chambly Oise players
FC Dunărea Călărași players
FC Viitorul Constanța players
FC Botoșani players
C.D. Santa Clara players
Championnat National 3 players
Championnat National 2 players
Ligue 1 players
Liga I players
Primeira Liga players
French expatriate footballers
French expatriate sportspeople in Romania
Expatriate footballers in Romania
French expatriate sportspeople in Portugal
Expatriate footballers in Portugal
Footballers from Normandy